Lewis–Thornburg Farm, also known as the Thornburg Farm, is a historic home and farm complex near Asheboro, Randolph County, North Carolina.

The farmhouse was built about 1855, and is a two-story, single-pile, three-bay, frame dwelling.  It has a gable roof and a two-story rear ell, a one-story rear kitchen wing and a one-story enclosed rear porch.  Other contributing resources are two grape arbors (c. 1950), a smokehouse (c. 1920), an equipment shed/garage (c. 1930), an outhouse (c. 1930), five chicken houses (c. 1930, c. 1950), a dog house and pen (c. 1950), pigeon boxes (c. 1950), two equipment sheds (c. 1950), a storage shed, a barn (c. 1900, c. 1950), a tack shed (c. 1950), a carriage house (c. 1900), a three-board fence (c. 1950), an animal chute (c. 1950), a hog shelter (c. 1950), a wood shed (c. 1950), a hog house (c. 1950), and the agricultural landscape.

It was added to the National Register of Historic Places in 2005.

References

Farms on the National Register of Historic Places in North Carolina
Houses completed in 1855
Buildings and structures in Randolph County, North Carolina
National Register of Historic Places in Randolph County, North Carolina